The AACA Museum is a transportation museum located in Hershey, Pennsylvania in the United States. It is a 501(c)(3) non-profit museum dedicated to the preservation of American automobile history. Despite its name the museum is not affiliated with the Antique Automobile Club of America.

The  museum displays over 130 cars, buses, motorcycles, and automobile collectibles in themed settings from the 1890s–1980s. It is an affiliate museum of the Smithsonian Institution, and the American Alliance of Museums. Its major collections include the Cammack Tucker Collection, the world's most extensive collection of Tucker automobiles, and the Museum of Bus Transportation collection.

In 2014, the museum won the NAAMY Award of Excellence from the National Association of Automobile Museums.

Collections

Cammack Tucker Collection
The AACA Museum holds the largest permanent collection of Tucker 48 automobiles in the world. Named for David Cammack, a historian and collector of Tucker automobiles, the entire collection was donated to the AACA Museum from Cammack's personal collection upon his death in 2013.

Museum of Bus Transportation Collection
Alongside the AACA grand opening in 2003, the Museum of Bus Transportation leased space in the museum's lower level to showcase their collection of 22 classic buses. As of 2020, the Museum of Bus Transportation owns roughly 33 buses, most of which are on display in the AACA Museum.

History
AACA Museum, Inc. was formed in 1993 as a public charitable organization with a mission to construct a museum to preserve all forms of historical motor vehicles. In 1996, the incorporation purchased 25 acres of land near the national club headquarters located in Hershey, Pennsylvania to be used as the site for the future museum building. Initial costs for the building were estimated at $11 million, and in 2000, the William J. Cammack Supporting Organization Trust pledged a multi-million dollar testamentary commitment, along with three 1947 Tucker Torpedo automobiles. Much of the rest of the fundraising was accomplished during the AACA annual car shows hosted in Hershey, PA.

The museum opened on June 26, 2003 with roughly 70 cars donated, or on loan from, the club's members. Rather than display their cars in long rows, the AACA Museum incorporated an educational approach in its displays by adding scenery and set designs that complement the period in which each car was built.

In 2013, the museum was named as one of the 12 car museums in the USA worth a detour by MSNBC.

Gallery

References

External links
AACA Museum website
Museum of Bus Transportation website

Automobile museums in Pennsylvania
Industry museums in Pennsylvania
Museums established in 2003